Maria Pappas is an American attorney, Greek American, and politician who has served as the Cook County Treasurer since 1998. Prior to that, she served two terms on the Cook County Board of Commissioners; first as one of ten members elected from Chicago and then, after the board moved to single-member constituencies, as the member from the 10th district.

Early life
Pappas was born June 7, 1949 in Warwood, a neighborhood of Wheeling, West Virginia, to first generation Greek American parents. She earned a bachelor's degree in sociology from West Liberty State College and a master's degree in counseling at West Virginia University. She then relocated to Chicago to work at the Adler Institute with Rudolf Dreikurs. She earned her Ph.D. from Loyola University in 1976. While a doctoral student, she received a state grant to work with mothers at Altgeld Garden Homes. She then taught at Governors State University until switching to the legal field; graduating from Chicago Kent College of Law at the Illinois Institute of Technology in 1982.

Political career
Pappas chose to run for one of ten positions elected at large from the City of Chicago. She received the first spot on the ballot and won. While a member of the Cook County Board, she had a political rivalry with then Board President Richard Phelan. She ran for the Democratic nomination to succeed Phelan as Board President in 1994. She lost to fellow board member John Stroger in a three-way race that also included County Clerk Aurelia Pucinski.

In 1998, she was elected Cook County Treasurer. In her first year, she tripled the amount of interest earned by the Treasurer's office and uncovered a scam run by her predecessor Edward J. Rosewell. Rosewell resigned as Treasurer after being convicted for his role in a ghost payroll scheme. She has been re-elected five times: 2002, 2006, 2010, 2014, and 2018. As Treasurer, she was the chief proponent of the Cook County Debt Disclosure Ordinance, passed in 2009, which requires taxing districts to publicly report their finances, including pension debt.

She ran for United States Senate in 2004, losing the Democratic nomination to Barack Obama. She explored a run for Mayor of Chicago in 2011, but chose not to run.

After Rahm Emanuel announced he would not seek reelection, Pappas considered running for Mayor of Chicago in 2019, but ultimately did not run.

References

1949 births
21st-century American politicians
21st-century American women politicians
American people of Greek descent
Chicago-Kent College of Law alumni
Cook County Treasurers
Illinois Democrats
Living people
Loyola University Chicago alumni
Members of the Cook County Board of Commissioners
Politicians from Wheeling, West Virginia
West Liberty University alumni
West Virginia State University alumni
Women in Illinois politics